Appias epaphia, the diverse white or African albatross, is a butterfly of the family Pieridae. It is found in Africa, south of the Sahara. The habitat consists of forests and heavy woodland.

Adults are on wing year-round, but mainly from March to May in southern Africa.

The larvae feed on Capparis species (including Capparis sepiaria), Maerua racemulosa, and Boscia albitrunca.

Subspecies
A. e. aequatorialis Mendes & Bivar de Sousa, 2006 (São Tomé Island)
A. e. angolensis Mendes & Bivar de Sousa, 2006 (Angola)
A. e. epaphia (Senegal, Gambia, Guinea, Sierra Leone, Liberia, Ivory Coast, Burkina Faso, Ghana, Togo, Benin, Nigeria, Niger, Cameroon, Equatorial Guinea, Gabon, Congo, Central African Republic, Angola, Democratic Republic of the Congo, western Uganda (Bwamba Forest), western Kenya)
A. e. contracta (Butler, 1888) (South Sudan, Ethiopia, eastern Kenya, Tanzania, Zambia, Mozambique, Zimbabwe, north-eastern Botswana, South Africa (Limpopo Province, Mpumalanga, KwaZulu-Natal, Eastern Cape Province), Eswatini, Comoro Islands)
A. e. orbona (Boisduval, 1833) (Madagascar)
A. e. piresi Mendes & Bivar de Sousa, 2006 (Príncipe Island)

References

Seitz, A. Die Gross-Schmetterlinge der Erde 13: Die Afrikanischen Tagfalter. Plate XIII 11

epaphia
Butterflies of Africa
Butterflies described in 1779